Mohammadabad (also Romanized as Moḩammadābād) is a village in Forg Rural District, Forg District, Darab County, Fars Province, Iran. At the 2006 census, its population was 442, in 93 families.

References 

Populated places in Darab County